Jefferson Jordan Milano Durán (born 21 November 1995) is a Venezuelan cyclist. He represented Venezuela at the 2016 Summer Olympics in the Men's BMX event.

Milano won a gold medal at the 2018 Central American and Caribbean Games in the Men's BMX event. He represented Venezuela at the 2019 Pan American Games in the Men's BMX racing event.

Notes

References

External links
 
 

1995 births
Living people
Venezuelan male cyclists
Olympic cyclists of Venezuela
Cyclists at the 2016 Summer Olympics
Pan American Games competitors for Venezuela
Cyclists at the 2019 Pan American Games
Central American and Caribbean Games medalists in cycling
Central American and Caribbean Games gold medalists for Venezuela
Competitors at the 2018 Central American and Caribbean Games
BMX riders
21st-century Venezuelan people